Christian Körner (born 29 March 1949) is an Austrian–Swiss botanist and emeritus professor at the University of Basel. He is one of the world's most renowned scientists in the field of alpine plant ecology.

Life 
Körner was born in Salzburg. Between 1968 and 1973, he studied biology and geosciences at the University of Innsbruck. He completed his PhD on water relations of alpine plants in 1977 at the University of Innsbruck (supervised by Walter Larcher). From 1977 to 1980, he did a Postdoc in the Austrian MAB alpine program (alpine water cycle, hydrology) and field work in the Caucasus (Georgia), followed by research stays (1981, 1989) at the Australian National University, Canberra. From 1982 to 1989, Körner was senior lecturer at the University of Innsbruck (1982: “Habilitation” for botany). In 1989, he became full professor of botany at the University of Basel. Since 2014, Körner is emeritus.

He is chair of the Alpine Research Station ALPFOR on the Furkapass, Switzerland. Together with Erika Hiltbrunner and others, he researches alpine plant life at the ALPFOR station.

Körner has a widely known talent in explaining complex and seemingly difficult subjects. This talent attracted broad interest outside the scientific community. This was especially the case when Körner was invited by His Majesty the King of Sweden in 2003 to participate in a private royal colloquium aimed at describing and discussing the problems of global environmental change for the biosphere. Furthermore, Körner likes science mediation and comedy. Therefore, he attended the BES Science Slam 2015 in Edinburgh, performing 'What carbon cyclists can learn from bankers'.

Research interests 
Alpine plant ecology and biodiversity
High elevation treeline research
Increasing CO2 concentration
Climatic limits of European broad-leaved tree taxa

Academic achievements 
Highest score in Ecology for all German, Austrian and Swiss research institutions 1997-1998 (Bild der Wiss. 8/1999)
Highest cited category of authors ISI (since 2000)
Member of the Leopoldina (since 2000)
Marsh Award, British Ecological Society (2007)
King Albert Mountain Award by the King Albert I. Memorial Foundation for outstanding contribution to mountain research (2010)
Co-author 'Strasburger' Botany textbook (founded 1894, 35-37th German, Ital, Span, Russ, Engl eds)
Dr. h.c. (University of Innsbruck, Austria 2013)
Dr. h.c. (Ilia State University, Tbilisi, Georgia 2014)

Key publications 
Körner C., Asshoff R., Bignucolo O., Hättenschwiler S., Keel S.G. et al. (2005) Carbon flux and growth in mature deciduous forest trees exposed to elevated CO2. Science, Bd. 309, S. 1360-1362.
Körner C. (2006) Plant CO2 responses: an issue of definition, time and resource supply. New Phytologist, Bd. 172, S. 393-411.
Körner C. (2015) A paradigm shift in plant growth control. Curr Opin Plant Biol 25:107-114
Körner C., Basler D., Hoch G., Kollas C., Lenz A., Randin C.F., Vitasse Y., Zimmermann N.E. (2016) Where, why and how? Explaining the low-temperature range limits of temperate tree species. J Ecol 104:1076-1088
Klein T., Siegwolf R.T.W., Körner C. (2016) Belowground carbon trade among tall trees in a temperate forest. Science 352:342-344
Körner C. (2017) A matter of tree longevity. Science 355:130-131

Books 
Körner C. (2003) Alpine plant life. 2nd. Edition; Springer, Berlin
Körner C. (2012) Alpine treelines. Springer, Berlin
Körner C. (2013) Plant ecology (Chapt 11-14). In: Bresinsky et al. (eds) Strasburger's plant sciences. Springer, Berlin

External links 
Körner on the Website of University of Basel
 Körner on ResearchGate
Hättenschwiler S., Arnone J. (2013). "A tribute to Christian Körner for his 25 years of service on the Oecologia editorial board" (PDF). Oecologia. 171: 605–611.

References 

20th-century Austrian botanists
Scientists from Salzburg
1949 births
Living people
21st-century Swiss botanists
University of Innsbruck alumni
Academic staff of the University of Basel
20th-century Swiss botanists